The 2023 Citrus Bowl was a college football bowl game played on January 2, 2023, at Camping World Stadium in Orlando, Florida. The 77th annual Citrus Bowl, the game featured the LSU Tigers of the Southeastern Conference (SEC) and the Purdue Boilermakers of the Big Ten Conference. The game began at 1:08 p.m. EST and was aired on ABC. It was one of the 2022–23 bowl games concluding the 2022 FBS football season. LSU won 63-7. The 56 point margin tied the 2008 GMAC Bowl and 2018 Armed Forces Bowl for second largest margin of victory in any bowl game.

On November 15, 2022, Kellogg's, the parent company of the Cheez-It brand which already sponsored the Cheez-It Bowl at Camping World Stadium, announced it had also purchased sponsorship rights to the Citrus Bowl, making it officially the Cheez-It Citrus Bowl.

Teams
On December 4, 2022, it was announced that the game would feature LSU of the Southeastern Conference (SEC) and Purdue of the Big Ten. This was the first-ever meeting between the two programs.

LSU

LSU played to a 9–3 regular-season record, 6–2 in conference play. They faced three ranked teams, defeating Ole Miss and Alabama while losing to Tennessee. The Tigers qualified for the SEC Championship Game, which they lost to top-ranked Georgia. LSU entered the bowl 17th in the College Football Playoff (CFP) ranking, with an overall 9–4 record.

Purdue

Purdue compiled an 8–4 regular season record, 6–3 in conference play. They faced two ranked opponents, defeating both Minnesota and Illinois. The Boilermakers qualified for the Big Ten Championship Game, which they lost to second-ranked Michigan. Purdue entered the bowl unranked and with an 8–5 overall record.

Game summary

LSU set new Citrus Bowl records for most points scored (63), largest margin of victory (56), and total offensive yards (594).

Statistics

See also
 2022 Cheez-It Bowl, contested at the same venue on December 29, and also sponsored by Cheez-It

References

Citrus Bowl
Citrus Bowl (game)
Citrus Bowl
Citrus Bowl
LSU Tigers football bowl games
Purdue Boilermakers football bowl games